Owen Gilbert Ivins was born 19 September 1991 in Vereeniging, South Africa. He is a New Zealand cricketer who plays for the Northern Districts Knights in the Plunket Shield.

External links
  from Cricinfo.
  from CricketArchive.

1991 births
Living people
New Zealand cricketers
Northern Districts cricketers
People from Vereeniging
21st-century New Zealand people